Vulgar Marxism is a particular "belief that one can directly access the real conditions of history" and is sometimes referred to as "reflection theory"

Robert M. Young (1998) stated that "Vulgar Marxism" was 
He adds that "There are variations in how literally this is taken and various Marxist-inspired and Marxist-related positions define the interrelations among science and other historical forces more or less loosely. There is a continuum of positions. The most orthodox provides one-to-one correlations between the socio-economic base and the intellectual superstructure. This is referred to as economism or vulgar Marxism."

John Phillips of National University of Singapore states that Julia Kristeva understands "vulgar Marxism" as synonymous with "Vulgar Sociologism", a view that "characterises ideology in terms of a superstructure determined by an economic/historical base (base and superstructure)."

References

Marxist schools of thought
Marxist theory
Philosophy of history